Tufton may refer to:

Places
 Tufton, Hampshire, a village in the English county of Hampshire
 Tufton, Pembrokeshire, a place in the Welsh county of Pembrokeshire
 Tufton Farm, a farm previously owned by Thomas Jefferson in Albermarle County, Virginia

People
Any of several Earls of Thanet in the United Kingdom, including:
Nicholas Tufton, 1st Earl of Thanet (1578–1631)
John Tufton, 2nd Earl of Thanet (1608–1664)
Nicholas Tufton, 3rd Earl of Thanet (1631–1679)
John Tufton, 4th Earl of Thanet (1638–1680)
Richard Tufton, 5th Earl of Thanet (1640–1684)
Thomas Tufton, 6th Earl of Thanet (1644–1729)
Sackville Tufton, 7th Earl of Thanet (1688–1753)
Sackville Tufton, 8th Earl of Thanet (1733–1786)
Sackville Tufton, 9th Earl of Thanet (1767–1825)
Charles Tufton, 10th Earl of Thanet (1770–1832)
Henry Tufton, 11th Earl of Thanet (1775–1849)

Satire
 Sir Bufton Tufton is one of the Recurring in-jokes in Private Eye